Arctostaphylos hookeri is a species of manzanita known by the common name Hooker's manzanita.

Description
Arctostaphylos hookeri is a low shrub which is variable in appearance and has several subspecies. These are generally mat-forming plants or low bushes with small green leaves, dense inflorescences of white to pink flowers, and shiny egg-shaped or round red drupes.

Distribution
The Arctostaphylos hookeri shrub is endemic to California where its native range extends from the coastal San Francisco Bay Area to the Central Coast. It grows in sandy, coastal pine or oak woods.

Subspecies
There are two subspecies recognised:
A. h. hearstiorum - Hearst's manzanita - native to San Luis Obispo County
A. h. hookeri - grows in the Santa Cruz Mountains and nearby

See also
California chaparral and woodlands
California coastal sage and chaparral

References

External links

Jepson Manual Treatment - Arctostaphylos hookeri
USDA Plants Profile; Arctostaphylos hookeri
 Conservation: Arctostaphylos hookeri ssp. ravenii
Arctostaphylos hookeri - Photo gallery

hookeri
Endemic flora of California
Natural history of the California chaparral and woodlands
Natural history of the San Francisco Bay Area
Natural history of San Francisco
Endemic flora of the San Francisco Bay Area
Garden plants of North America
Drought-tolerant plants